Yekaterina Nesterenko (born 11 October 1976 in Tambov) is a Russian former alpine skier who competed in the 1998 Winter Olympics, where she finished 29th in the Women's downhill.

External links
 
 

1976 births
Living people
Russian female alpine skiers
Olympic alpine skiers of Russia
Alpine skiers at the 1998 Winter Olympics
Sportspeople from Tambov
20th-century Russian women